() is a Hebrew language name and song used by a subgroup of Breslover Hasidim colloquially known as the . It is a kabbalistic formula based on the four Hebrew letters of the name , referring to the founder of the Breslov movement, Rebbe Nachman of Breslov, along with a reference to his burial place in Uman, Ukraine.

The seventh line of this  is signed , which became Rabbi Odesser's personal meditation and song. Before he died, he taught this phrase to a group of devotees who formed the  movement.

History of the phrase

The  phrase was revealed to and taught by Rabbi Yisroel Ber Odesser, the authentic Breslov figure who was born in 1888 in Tiberias. Rabbi Israel was among the first Breslover Hasidim in Israel, having learned about the movement from Rabbi Yisroel Halpern when he was a young yeshiva student.

When he was 33 years old, Rabbi Israël was overcome with weakness and hunger on the Fast of Tammuz.  He decided or rather felt that he had to eat, in connection to the great that befell on him then.  But immediately after eating, he felt great sorrow at having succumbed to his own physical temptations. After six continuous days of prayer, a powerful thought came to him: "Go into your room!" He did as the inner voice said, went to the bookcase, that was locked and only himself had the key of the locker, and randomly opened a book. In the book was a piece of paper that he would later call "The Letter from Heaven." The paper, written in Hebrew, with one line in Yiddish, is translated as follows:

R. I. Odesser the understood the letter to be a message of consolation, above other marvellous things inside, directly from Rebbe Nachman's spirit to himself here on earth. Odesser adopted  as his personal meditation and song, and became so totally identified with it that he later said, "I am !" (This quote appears on Odesser's tombstone in Jerusalem.)

Pronunciation and meaning of the phrase

During his lifetime, Rebbe Nachman spoke of a "Song of Redemption" that would be revealed before the coming of the Jewish Messiah. This song would be in a "single, double, triple, quadruple" form.. The  phrase has such a structure (keeping in mind that Hebrew often omits the vowels) and is based on the Rebbe's name, "Nachman":

  (One Hebrew letter: Nun) — 
  (Two Hebrew letters: Nun-Chet) — 
  (Three Hebrew letters: Nun-Chet-Mem) —  
  (Four Hebrew letters: Nun-Chet-Mem-Nun) — 
  (a pun:  it can mean "from Uman", Rebbe Nachman's burial place, and can also mean "believed" or "accredited".) — 

The phrase is pronounced with a soft A sound as in "ah" and a guttural KH sound as in German "ach." It is usually accented as follows:

.

Speakers of Yiddish have also noted that  can mean "now to," which would loosely translate the phrase as "Now to Nachman from Uman," that is, traveling to the Rebbe on pilgrimage to his gravesite or in one's heart.

Popularity of the phrase today
Whatever the origins of this phrase, it is now very popular among a subgroup group of Breslover Hasidim who follow Rabbi Odesser, who are colloquially known as the Na Nachs. The name has been incorporated into both traditional and contemporary Jewish music, appeared on bumper stickers, billboards and public graffiti throughout Israel, and is used on jewellery and amulets. Among some groups of Sephardic Jewish youth in Israel, it has become a sort of rallying cry for returning to traditional Judaism, although not necessarily to mainstream Breslov.

More recently, some people have begun to wear the words of the phrase crocheted on large, white yarmulkes with a little tassel on top. (These hats are a modification of a traditional white yarmulke that has been worn in Jerusalem for centuries. That style, in turn, apparently evolved from the medieval Jewish hat with the ball on top — hence the tassel.) When Rabbi Odesser was still alive, some of his followers were already wearing large white yarmulkes, but without the phrase on them. Today, the  make this crocheted yarmulke part of their uniform attire.  yarmulkes in other colors are also appearing on the market and are a popular item for Purim.

Bibliography

  ("The Compass of the Petek"), by Amos Levi. Thus the Hebrew letters of the word , מאד, can be rearranged to spell Adam, אדם, the first person to live in those years. 
 Seventy Rectifications of the  
  ("This Will Comfort Us"), by Rabbi Yitzhak .

References

Sources

 Young Buds of the Stream, letters to Zalman Shazar from Rabbi Odesser, English edition published by Netzach Yisroel Press, Israel 1995.  Pages 37–43 contain a detailed explanation of the meaning of the phrase.
 Outpouring of the Soul, translated by Aryeh Kaplan.  (Compilation of Nachman of Breslov's quotes on meditation and prayer).  Breslov Research Institute, 1980.

External links
 Rabbi Yisroel Ber Odesser page—direct link to the section discussing the authenticity of the Letter from Heaven (including handwriting analysis, police lab analysis of the paper, etc.) and cites references to similar miraculous letters mentioned in the Talmud.
 NaNach.Net Current news about Na Nachs all over the world. Sabba Yisroel, the community, pictures, videos and articles about people shouting Na Nach Nachma Nachman Meuman!
 Haaretz, 5/25/08 Ha'aretz:  Rolling with the Na Nachs, the most high-spirited and newest Hasidic sect

Breslov Hasidism
Hebrew words and phrases